Michael Divinity Jr. (born May 13, 1997) is an American football outside linebacker for the BC Lions of the Canadian Football League (CFL). He played college football at LSU.

Early life and high school
Divinity played quarterback on the freshman team at John Curtis Christian High School. He transferred to John Ehret High School prior to his sophomore year and switched to defense. He helped the team to their first state championship game appearance in 30 years as a senior. Divinity earned All-America honors as a junior and a senior. He was considered to be a five-star prospect that was ranked the nation's No. 6 outside linebacker and the No. 64 prospect overall by 247Sports. Divinity committed to LSU over offers from Alabama, Texas A&M, Michigan, Florida, Texas, and Florida State, among others.

College career
Divinity played as a true freshman in 2016 and made his first start in 2017 against Notre Dame in the Citrus Bowl. As a junior in 2018, Divinity started 11 of 12 games and finished with 54 tackles including 9.5 tackles for loss, a team-high-tying five sacks, eight quarterback hurries, one interception, one forced fumble and two fumble recoveries. He posted a career-high 10 tackles and a sack in the big win at Texas early in his senior year. However, Divinity served a two-game suspension, missed a game with an injury, and then had a six-game suspension for another violation of team and university rules regarding marijuana use. As a result of the suspensions, he left the team but returned to practice on November 18. He was cleared to play in the National Championship Game. During his senior season, Divinity finished with 23 tackles including four for loss and 3.0 sacks. In his career, he posted 104 tackles (50 solo), nine sacks, two forced fumbles, and an interception.

Divinity performed poorly in NFL combine measurements. He tied for second to last at linebacker with 14 repetitions on the 225-pound bench press. He ran a 4.85 40-yard dash that was the fourth slowest for a linebacker, and his 31-inch vertical and 9-foot, 7-inch broad jump were also tied for the fourth worst at the combine.

Professional career

Tampa Bay Buccaneers
After going undrafted in the 2020 NFL draft, Divinity signed an undrafted free agent deal with the Tampa Bay Buccaneers. He was waived on September 5, 2020.

Seattle Seahawks
On October 7, 2020, Divinity was signed by the Seattle Seahawks to their practice squad. He was released on November 3.

BC Lions
Divinity signed with the BC Lions of the CFL on June 10, 2021. He was placed on the suspended list on July 2, 2021. On September 20, he was added to the main roster.

Personal life
He is the oldest of four children of Leslie Gilmore and Michael Divinity Sr. His mother is a teacher's assistant and his father is a produce manager at a Winn-Dixie. In November 2015, the family home in Marrero, Louisiana was ransacked during the foreclosure process. Divinity has a daughter.

References

External links
Tampa Bay Buccaneers bio
LSU Tigers bio

1997 births
Living people
People from Marrero, Louisiana
Players of American football from Louisiana
John Ehret High School alumni
American football linebackers
LSU Tigers football players
Tampa Bay Buccaneers players
Seattle Seahawks players
BC Lions players